Fakt (Polish for "fact") is a Polish tabloid daily newspaper published in Warsaw, Poland, by Ringier Axel Springer Polska (a Swiss-German joint-venture subsidiary of Axel Springer SE and Ringier), and is one of the best-selling papers in Poland.

History and profile
Fakt was launched in October 2003 by the Polish outlet of the German publisher Axel Springer AG, and modeled on Springer's German tabloid Bild, the biggest-selling newspaper in Europe. Like its German counterpart, Fakt is characterized by its down-market, often sensationalist journalism with a populist appeal. However, politically it is by and large centrist. The paper supported policies of the former prime minister Kazimierz Marcinkiewicz, a regular commentator. Other op-ed writers include journalist Tomasz Lis, former TVN anchorman Kamil Durczok, and former Rzeczpospolita columnist Maciej Rybiński.

In the early 2000s, Fakt had a weekly supplement contrasting to its tabloid content, Europa which featured essays by scholars and intellectuals including Niall Ferguson, Francis Fukuyama, Jürgen Habermas, and Robert Kagan.

In 2003, the circulation of Fakt was 715,000 copies making it the best-selling newspaper in Poland. Since its launch, Fakt replaced the middle-market Gazeta Wyborcza as Poland's biggest-selling newspaper, also putting pressure on the older national tabloid Super Express. In 2005, to compete directly with Fakt, Gazeta Wyborcza publisher Agora responded with a failed middle-market paper Nowy Dzień.

When Fakt was launched at a price of 1 złoty, Super Express publisher Media Express sued Axel Springer for dumping, however having lost the lawsuit, it leveled the price of Super Express to equal Fakt.

Criticism
Like Bild and other tabloids, Fakt has been subjected to criticism concerning its style of journalism from media watchdogs. The Polish Journalists Association (pl:Stowarzyszenie Dziennikarzy Polskich) awarded Fakt twice with a "Hyena of the Year" award, for "a particular unscrupulousness and neglect of the principles of the journalistic work ethics." In 2004, Fakt published a photograph showing the nude dead body of a murder victim. In 2005, it published the photo of an innocent person with the caption "This sex offender is at large."

See also
 List of newspapers in Poland

References

External links
 

2003 establishments in Poland
Newspapers published in Warsaw
Daily newspapers published in Poland
Polish-language newspapers
Publications established in 2003
Axel Springer SE
Polish news websites